The acronym ICLR may refer to:
 Incorporated Council of Law Reporting, a British registered charity
 International Comparative Literature Association, an international organization dedicated to comparative literature
 International Conference on Learning Representations, a machine learning conference.